The meridian 95° west of Greenwich is a line of longitude that extends from the North Pole across the Arctic Ocean, North America, the Gulf of Mexico, Central America, the Pacific Ocean, the Southern Ocean, and Antarctica to the South Pole.

The 95th meridian west forms a great circle with the 85th meridian east.

From Pole to Pole
Starting at the North Pole and heading south to the South Pole, the 95th meridian west passes through:

{| class="wikitable plainrowheaders"
! scope="col" width="120" | Co-ordinates
! scope="col" | Country, territory or sea
! scope="col" | Notes
|-
| style="background:#b0e0e6;" | 
! scope="row" style="background:#b0e0e6;" | Arctic Ocean
| style="background:#b0e0e6;" |
|-valign="top"
| 
! scope="row" | 
| Nunavut — Axel Heiberg Island, Bjarnason Island and Axel Heiberg Island again 
|-
| style="background:#b0e0e6;" | 
! scope="row" style="background:#b0e0e6;" | Massey Sound
| style="background:#b0e0e6;" |
|-
| 
! scope="row" | 
| Nunavut — Amund Ringnes Island
|-
| style="background:#b0e0e6;" | 
! scope="row" style="background:#b0e0e6;" | Hendriksen Strait
| style="background:#b0e0e6;" |
|-
| 
! scope="row" | 
| Nunavut — Cornwall Island
|-
| style="background:#b0e0e6;" | 
! scope="row" style="background:#b0e0e6;" | Belcher Channel
| style="background:#b0e0e6;" |
|-
| 
! scope="row" | 
| Nunavut — Devon Island
|-valign="top"
| style="background:#b0e0e6;" | 
! scope="row" style="background:#b0e0e6;" | Queens Channel
| style="background:#b0e0e6;" |
|-
| 
! scope="row" | 
| Nunavut — Dundas Island
|-
| style="background:#b0e0e6;" | 
! scope="row" style="background:#b0e0e6;" | Queens Channel
| style="background:#b0e0e6;" | Passing just west of Baillie-Hamilton Island, Nunavut,  (at )
|-
| 
! scope="row" | 
| Nunavut — Cornwallis Island
|-valign="top"
| style="background:#b0e0e6;" | 
! scope="row" style="background:#b0e0e6;" | Parry Channel
| style="background:#b0e0e6;" | Barrow Strait — passing just west of Griffith Island, Nunavut,  (at )
|-valign="top"
| 
! scope="row" | 
| Nunavut — Somerset Island and the Boothia Peninsula (mainland)
|-
| style="background:#b0e0e6;" | 
! scope="row" style="background:#b0e0e6;" | Rae Strait
| style="background:#b0e0e6;" | Passing just east of King William Island, Nunavut,  (at )
|-valign="top"
| 
! scope="row" | 
| Nunavut — mainland Manitoba — from  Ontario — from 
|-
| 
! scope="row" | 
| Minnesota — Northwest Angle
|-
| style="background:#b0e0e6;" | 
! scope="row" style="background:#b0e0e6;" | Lake of the Woods
| style="background:#b0e0e6;" |
|-valign="top"
| 
! scope="row" | 
|-
| style="background:#b0e0e6;" | 
! scope="row" style="background:#b0e0e6;" | Gulf of Mexico
| style="background:#b0e0e6;" |
|-valign="top"
| 
! scope="row" | 
| Veracruz Oaxaca — from 
|-
| style="background:#b0e0e6;" | 
! scope="row" style="background:#b0e0e6;" | Pacific Ocean
| style="background:#b0e0e6;" |
|-
| style="background:#b0e0e6;" | 
! scope="row" style="background:#b0e0e6;" | Southern Ocean
| style="background:#b0e0e6;" |
|-
| 
! scope="row" | Antarctica
| Unclaimed territory
|-
|}

See also
94th meridian west
96th meridian west

w095 meridian west